Stenoptilia latistriga is a moth of the family Pterophoridae. It is found in the South Siberian Mountains of Russia.

References

Moths described in 1916
latistriga
Moths of Asia